The original campus of Centenary College of Louisiana is located along College Street in Jackson, Louisiana.  It is operated and preserved as a museum by the Louisiana Office of State Parks as the Centenary State Historic Site, offering educational interpretive programs and guided tours.

The College of Louisiana 1825-1844
In 1825, the Louisiana Legislature chartered four public colleges.  One of these was the College of Louisiana at Jackson, a small town on the border of East and West Feliciana Parishes.  Despite the tireless efforts of the trustees to maintain a college of the finest repute, in its 20-year history, the college only produced 24 graduates.  Its main contributions to the future of the campus were the East and West Wing dormitories, two impressive brick barracks-style structures built between 1832 and 1837.

One of the key figured in the College of Louisiana was William King, who ran its preparatory school, Mathews Academy. When the college suffered from low enrollment, King agreed to combine the two schools, though doing so was not enough to save the college from sale two years later. King later became famous for his disdain of slavery and for founding the Elgin settlement in Ontario, a home for escaped slaves who had reached Canada via the Underground Railroad.

Centenary College of Louisiana 1845-1861
Several institutions of higher learning sprouted in and around Jackson in the autumn of 1845, somewhat as a result of Centenary College of Louisiana's opening at that time. (Centenary College, a Methodist church-affiliated institution, was founded in Mississippi in 1839; then it relocated to Louisiana.)

The Episcopal women's academy, the Southern Institute for Young Ladies, opened the year before, under the direction of Rev. William B. Lacey—who had been a president of the College of Louisiana.  The school continued in operation until 1860. The Feliciana Female Collegiate Institute opened in 1847, led by the Methodist Episcopal Rev. Benjamin Jones and his wife.  It also continued until the outbreak of the American Civil War.

The greatest event of the social calendar in antebellum Jackson was Centenary's annual commencement.  The small town was pushed to its limits at that time, as dignitaries from across the state and region crowded its hotels and private homes for the occasion.  More people than usual were in attendance for the 1856 commencement, as it included the ceremony of placing the cornerstone for the college's new Centre Building.

Included in this building were all offices, classrooms, laboratories, debate halls, etc.  The building also featured a 3,000-volume library, and an auditorium which seated between two and three thousand.  When completed, the structure dwarfed the dormitories upon either side (pictured).

The completion of the Centre Building marked the high-water mark of Centenary's tenure in Jackson.  However, it was fated to be short-lived.  Less than three years after the building was completed, the college closed, the vast majority of its students having joined the Confederate Army.  The last entry in the minutes of the Board of Trustees in 1861 reads "Students have all gone to War—College suspended, and God Help the Right!"

Civil War period
Although no longer a college, Centenary's campus was not altogether abandoned.  The preparatory department continued for some time, and upon its closing the campus was transformed into a Confederate hospital.  More than 500 Confederate soldiers — mostly from the Siege of Port Hudson — were treated at the Centenary hospital.  Some eighty of those sent to Centenary died there; they were buried in a cemetery on the grounds.

After the fall of Port Hudson, Centenary was taken over by the Union Army, and used as a field hospital, supply depot, and recruiting post — primarily for the United States Colored Troops.  A large contingent of Confederate States Army cavalry was sent to disrupt the recruiting practices, resulting in the largest battle to occur within the town limits of Jackson.  The Confederates suffered minimal casualties, routed Union forces, and captured ammunition and other supplies.  The Union Army suffered nearly one-third of its garrison detachment killed or wounded.

Postwar struggle 1865-1908
Centenary College of Louisiana reopened in the autumn of 1865, in a completely different world than the one that had forced its closing four years earlier. Many of those who had previously sent their sons to Centenary either could no longer afford to, or they no longer had sons to send.

Faced with these dire straits, the president of the college would often be away for months at a time.  He would go door-to-door, soliciting financial support, or he'd visit as many Methodist congregations as he could, "passing the hat," all to little avail.

The desperation reached the point of not being able to compensate the professors.  The policy was, in short: if the college had the money, the professors would be paid.  To make up for this deficiency, in the late 1890s five professors' cottages were constructed.  The sole extant cottage is one of the most visible features of the campus today.

Another move made during the 1890s to boost enrollment was the admittance of female students.  Women were not originally given degrees or diplomas.  They were given certificates of attendance, which, in essence, meant they were qualified to teach school.  The first degree was conferred upon a female graduate in 1901.

Epilogue
In 1903, the prominent Methodist citizens of Shreveport, Louisiana, offered Centenary , a brand new facility, and a sizeable monetary grant if they would relocate.  Given the college's difficulty in procuring financial support where they were, and the several attractive opportunities Shreveport presented, it was not a matter of if they would move, but when.  This turned out to be 1906, although the college was not there in its entirety until 1908.

After the college's departure, the campus sat unused for fifteen years.  In the mid-1920s it was used as a tuberculosis hospital.  But by 1935, the campus was in a state of extreme disrepair, and on the brink of condemnation.  The three buildings had three different owners, two of whom chose to sell the rights for demolition.  The East Wing and Centre Building were both demolished, and the salvageable materials from them were sold for scrap.  There were many buildings constructed in that time in southeast Louisiana whose materials included those of the main academic building.  The Old Centenary Inn—currently a bed and breakfast—in Jackson was built entirely from the remains of the East Wing dormitory.

The West Wing remained standing because its owners had come up with a way to make it far more lucrative than just knocking it down.  From 1938 to 1965, the West Wing Dormitory was low-income housing.  The campus itself was used as a trailer park.  To this day, there are visible remnants of the residences that were here during that time.

In the 1970s, the only use the campus saw was a baseball field, which happened to be on the site of the college's baseball field more than 80 years earlier.  In 1977, not long before it was to be demolished, the West Wing was saved due to the efforts of many influential citizens in and around Jackson.  The State of Louisiana purchased and restored the West Wing, Professor's Cottage, and surrounding .

The  area comprising the West Wing and the Professor's Cottage was added as Centenary College to the National Register of Historic Places on April 19, 1979. The area was also included in the Jackson Historic District since its creation on December 4, 1980.

Centenary State Historic Site
Centenary State Historic Site is run by the Louisiana Office of State Parks.  It is a rather young location among the state's parks, and there is much that can yet be done to make it more educationally profitable.  It serves not only as a glimpse into the past of Centenary College of Louisiana but to early education in Louisiana, Civil War medicine, the founding of Jackson, and other topics of local and state history.

See also
Jackson Historic District
National Register of Historic Places listings in East Feliciana Parish, Louisiana
List of Louisiana state historic sites

References

External links

Centenary State Historic Site  - official site

American Civil War hospitals
Louisiana State Historic Sites
Educational institutions established in 1825
Defunct universities and colleges in Louisiana
Public universities and colleges in Louisiana
Museums in East Feliciana Parish, Louisiana
Education museums in the United States
History museums in Louisiana
Protected areas of East Feliciana Parish, Louisiana
University and college buildings on the National Register of Historic Places in Louisiana
Greek Revival architecture in Louisiana
Residential buildings completed in 1837
Education in East Feliciana Parish, Louisiana
1825 establishments in Louisiana
National Register of Historic Places in East Feliciana Parish, Louisiana